Owings Mills station is a Metro SubwayLink station in Owings Mills, Maryland. The station is experiencing transit-oriented development from Metro Centre at Owings Mills, bringing many apartments, office space, retail, restaurants, and condominiums to the area adjacent to the station. It has more parking spaces than all other stops along the line. The station is located in the center median of Interstate 795 and is the northern terminus of the line.

The station provides direct connections to both sides of Interstate 795 serving a Parking lot on one side with connections to MTA buses and Metro Centre at Owings Mills on the other side via an underground pedestrian tunnel. 

Two buses currently serve this station:  
87 to Glyndon
89 to Reisterstown Plaza
106 to Shepard Pratt Hospital (Towson) (SB)
Note = Both operate via Reisterstown Road and connection to Owings Mills Town Center

Station layout

Construction plans

Currently, construction with Transit oriented development is in place to build Metro Centre at Owings Mills on some of the ground of the Owings Mills Metro Subway Station that would include shops, hotels, office space, and townhouses. A garage has been built to replace some parking spaces lost due to this project.

References

Metro SubwayLink stations
Baltimore County, Maryland landmarks
Railway stations in the United States opened in 1987
Owings Mills, Maryland
1987 establishments in Maryland
Railway stations in Baltimore County, Maryland
Railway stations in highway medians